Charles H. Holm was a college football player, a prominent fullback for the Alabama Crimson Tide. He was drafted in the third round of the 1939 NFL Draft by the Washington Redskins, but shortly thereafter retired. He was the brother of Tony Holm.

References

American football fullbacks
Alabama Crimson Tide football players
Players of American football from Alabama
People from Fairfield, Alabama